Aslan Borisovich Dzhantimirov (born 25 February 1978) is a Russian football coach and a former player.

Dzhantimirov played in the Russian First Division with FC Druzhba Maykop.

External links
 

1978 births
Living people
Russian footballers
Russian football managers
FC Dynamo Stavropol managers
Place of birth missing (living people)
Association football midfielders